Street Sounds Hip Hop Electro 14 is the fourteenth compilation album in a series and was released 1986 on the StreetSounds label. The album was released on LP and cassette and contains eight electro music and old school hip hop tracks mixed by Herbie Laidley.

Track listing

References

External links
 Street Sounds Hip Hop Electro 14 at Discogs

1986 compilation albums
Hip hop compilation albums
Electro compilation albums